Giovanni Alfredo Lorini (born March 14, 1957) is an Italian professional football coach and former player.

He played 3 seasons (14 games, no goals) in Serie A for A.C. Milan and L.R. Vicenza, and made 299 appearances altogether in the Italian professional leagues.

His playing career ended with a five-year ban from football in the Totonero 1986 match-fixing scandal.

Honours
 Coppa Italia winner: 1976–77

References

1957 births
Living people
Italian footballers
Association football midfielders
A.C. Milan players
Venezia F.C. players
L.R. Vicenza players
A.C. Monza players
Genoa C.F.C. players
Brescia Calcio players
Serie A players
Serie B players
Italian football managers